Bayanpınar is a village in the Kızılırmak District of Çankırı Province in Turkey. Its population is 46 (2021). The village is populated by Kurds.

References

Villages in Kızılırmak District
Kurdish settlements in Turkey